"Big Picture" is a song performed by English trio London Grammar. The song was released in the United Kingdom as a digital download on 1 February 2017 as the second single from their second studio album Truth Is a Beautiful Thing (2017). The song peaked at number 73 on the UK Singles Chart.

Music video
A music video to accompany the release of "Big Picture" was first released onto YouTube on 1 February 2017 at a total length of four minutes and forty seconds.

Track listing

Charts

Certifications

Release history

References

2017 songs
2017 singles
London Grammar songs
Songs written by Hannah Reid
Songs written by Dan Rothman
Songs written by Dominic Major